Events in the year 1934 in Argentina.

Incumbents
President: Agustín Pedro Justo

Governors
Buenos Aires Province: none
Mendoza Province: Ricardo Videla

Vice Governors
Buenos Aires Province: vacant

Events
March 4 - Argentine legislative election, 1934
April 4 - establishment of Alumni de Villa María
June 24 - establishment of Centro Social y Recreativo Español
creation of Libertador General San Martín Department, Chaco

Births
 3 July – Aurora del Mar, actress (d. 2022)

Deaths
September 20 - Victor Mercante, Argentinian educator, died in Chile

Films
Ayer y Hoy (film), directed by Enrique Telémaco Susini
En la tierra del Guarán, directed by Lumiton
Galería de esperanzas, directed by Carlos de la Púa
Ídolos de la radio, directed by Eduardo Morera
Riachuelo, directed by Luis José Moglia Barth

See also
List of Argentine films of 1934

References

 
1930s in Argentina